Navid Maleksabet (born 11 August 1991 in Yazd) is an Iranian professional squash player. As of February 2018, he was ranked number 184 in the world. His first professional title was the 2017 Amir Kabir Cup.

References

1991 births
Living people
Iranian male squash players